"Lights On" is a song performed by British singer Katy B and serves as the second single from her debut album, On a Mission. It features UK-based R&B singer and rapper Ms. Dynamite. It was released in the United Kingdom on 10 December 2010 as a digital download. It peaked at number 4 on the UK Singles Chart on 26 December 2010.

Chart performance
Having initially been predicted to debut at number 2 behind The X Factor winner Matt Cardle's "When We Collide", "Lights On" debuted on the UK Singles Chart at number 4 on 26 December 2010. The single served as the highest new entry that week but was beaten by Cardle, Black Eyed Peas and Rihanna with "When We Collide", "The Time (Dirty Bit)" and "What's My Name?" respectively. After falling 7 places to number 11 on its second week in the chart, the single rebounded to its peak of number 4 on 9 January 2011, where it remained for two consecutive weeks. "Lights On" also debuted on the Scottish Singles Chart on 26 December at number 11, again serving as the highest new entry for the week ending 1 January 2011. The song later went on to reach new peak of number 9.

Track listing

Charts

Weekly charts

Year-end charts

Release history

Certifications and sales

References

Katy B songs
Ms. Dynamite songs
2010 singles
Songs written by Katy B
Songs written by Ms. Dynamite
2010 songs
Columbia Records singles